Cuni or CuNi may refer to

 Cuni.cz, Charles University in Prague, Czech Republic
 Cupronickel, an alloy of copper and nickel (CuNi)
 Preng Çuni, leader of the Communist Party of Albania 8 November
 Teuta Cuni (born 1973), Swedish boxer
 Pedro Cuni-Bravo, Spanish artist